Today's Specials is a cover album by The Specials, released in 1996 (see 1996 in music).  It is the first studio album by the group since 1984, albeit not involving the full original line-up.  Original members Neville Staple, Roddy Byers, Lynval Golding, and Horace Panter are joined by new members Mark Adams and Adam Birch, along with a number of sessions musicians.  Lead vocals are mostly handled by Staple and Golding, with Neville's daughter Sheena Staples contributing backing vocals to the album.

The album was released exclusively on CD in the US, UK and Canada, and on CD and cassette tape in the Netherlands. It did not receive favourable reviews from media or fans, with many reviewers decrying in particular the over-use of synthesizers and pre-programmed drums beats.  Neville Staple claims that several of the recordings were actually produced demos, and regrets including them on the album.

The tracks "Pressure Drop" and "Hypocrite" were released as singles in the UK.

Track listing

Personnel
Neville Staple - vocals, producer
Roddy Byers - vocals, guitar
Lynval Golding - guitar, vocals, harmonica, mixing
Horace Panter - bass guitar
Mark Adams - organ, keyboards, backing vocals, programming, mixing
Adam Birch - trombone, trumpet, horn, flugelhorn
Aitch Hyatt - drums, backing vocals
Kendell Smith - DJ Vocals
Sheena Staple - backing vocals
Stoker - producer, mixing
Tom Lowry - producer, programming, engineer
Jim Lansberry - programming, mixing, engineer
Mike Exeter - Engineer (Hypocrite)

References

1996 albums
The Specials albums
Virgin Records albums
Covers albums